William Gradit (born May 29, 1982) is a French professional basketball player who currently plays for SVBD of the Nationale Masculine 1.

Early career
Gradit had his basketball debuts with the youth centre of ALM Évreux Basket (Pro B) between 1997 and 1999 before going to United States and attending the Laurinburg Institute and then going to the Hill College between 2000 and 2002.

Professional career
Gradit joined Paris Racing of the French Pro A as a junior player of the team roster between 2002 and 2004. He then joined different Pro B teams, Rueil PB, FC Mulhouse Basket and Besançon BCD, before joining Vichy in 2006. With Vichy, Gradit won the Pro B championship in 2007 and consequently after the club's promotion he made his debut in Pro A. In 2009, he left Vichy for Stade Clermontois of the Pro B. In 2010, he joined Boulazac of the Pro B. In January 2011, he signs for Cholet Basket of the Pro A as a replacement for Fabien Causeur, who was injured.

References

External links
Gradit profile on LNB.fr

1982 births
Living people
Besançon BCD players
Cholet Basket players
Chorale Roanne Basket players
Élan Chalon players
FC Mulhouse Basket players
French expatriate basketball people in the United States
French men's basketball players
Hill College alumni
JA Vichy players
Junior college men's basketball players in the United States
Paris Racing Basket players
Metropolitans 92 players
Shooting guards